The Jyotish caste is a caste of people who practiced astrology originally. Many sources state that these people were part of the Brahmin caste. They hailed from Shakadweepa or Sakaldweep and therefore were called Sakaldweepiya or Shakadweepi Brahmans. After entering India, they mostly went to Northern India, but one of their settlement went to Odisha in the Eastern part of India.

They were well versed in Astrology and also did Vedic rituals, teaching, and practicing Ayurvedic treatments. However, in the wake of scientific researches, their importance decreased. As a result, the later generations lost the know-how of their ancestors and therefore lost their incomes. In addition, the poor financial state made them socially weak and backward.

However, at many places in Odisha, these people still practice Vedic rituals and act as temple worshipers. But in the undivided Puri district, their economic and social status is very low.
In all other places of India, the people practicing astrology are known as Panditji or Brahmans. In Odisha, they are struggling to regain their lost pride. They are Brahmins of Shakadweep and are now trying to get their social status back.

Sources: Padma Purana, Samba Purana

Social Status
They are Classified as an Other Backward Class (OBC) according to Reservation system of India.

References

External links
Central list of OBCs for the state of Orissa
List of SEBC - Socially and Economically Backward Classes - Sub-Castes

Social groups of Odisha
Indian castes